Durham School may refer to:

in England
 Durham School, an independent British day and boarding school for girls and boys (age 3-18) in Durham.

in the United States
(by state)
Durham School (Durham, Arkansas), listed on the NRHP in Arkansas
Durham School of the Arts, in Durham, North Carolina
Durham Public Schools, the public school system of Durham, North Carolina
Thomas Durham School, Philadelphia, PA, listed on the NRHP in Pennsylvania
Durham's Chapel School, Bethpage, TN, listed on the NRHP in Tennessee

See also
Durham High School (disambiguation)